The Roman Catholic Diocese of Carapeguá is a diocese located in the city of Carapeguá in the Ecclesiastical province of Asunción in Paraguay.

History
 On March 29, 1967, the Diocese of Carapeguá was established from the Diocese of Villarrica

Bishops
 Bishops of Carapeguá (Roman rite), in reverse chronological order
 Bishop Celestino Ocampo Gaona (June 16, 2018 – present)
 Bishop Joaquín Hermes Robledo Romero (July 9, 2010 – July 4, 2015), appointed Bishop of San Lorenzo
 Bishop Celso Yegros Estigarribia (April 6, 1983 – July 9, 2010)
 Bishop Angel Nicolás Acha Duarte (June 5, 1978 – June 24, 1982)

Coadjutor bishop
Joaquín Hermes Robledo Romero (2009-2010)

References
 GCatholic.org
 Catholic Hierarchy

Roman Catholic dioceses in Paraguay
Christian organizations established in 1967
Roman Catholic dioceses and prelatures established in the 20th century
Carapeguá, Roman Catholic Diocese of
Paraguarí Department